Herman Edward Daly (July 21, 1938 – October 28, 2022) was an American ecological and Georgist economist and professor at the School of Public Policy of University of Maryland, College Park in the United States, best known for his time as a senior economist at the World Bank from 1988 to 1994. In 1996, he was awarded the Right Livelihood Award for "defining a path of ecological economics that integrates the key elements of ethics, quality of life, environment and community."

Life and work 
Daly was born in Houston, Texas in 1938. Before joining the World Bank, Daly was a research associate at Yale University,  and Alumni Professor of Economics at Louisiana State University.

Daly was Senior Economist in the Environment Department of the World Bank, where he helped to develop policy guidelines related to sustainable development.  While there, he was engaged in environmental operations work in Latin America.  He is closely associated with theories of a steady-state economy.  He was a co-founder and associate editor of the journal, Ecological Economics.

In 1989 Daly and John B. Cobb developed the Index of Sustainable Economic Welfare (ISEW), which they proposed as a more valid measure of socio-economic progress than gross domestic product.

Daly is a recipient of an Honorary Right Livelihood Award, the Heineken Prize for Environmental Science from the Royal Netherlands Academy of Arts and Sciences, the 1992 University of Louisville Grawemeyer Award for Ideas Improving World Order,  the Sophie Prize (Norway), the Leontief Prize from the Global Development and Environment Institute, and was chosen as Man of the Year 2008 by Adbusters magazine. He is widely credited with having originated the idea of uneconomic growth, though some credit this to Marilyn Waring who developed it more completely in her study of the UN System of National Accounts. In 2014, Daly was the recipient of the Blue Planet Prize of the Asahi Glass Foundation. He died of a cerebral hemorrhage on October 28, 2022 at the age of 84.

Toward a Steady-State Economy
Daly was the editor of a long-lived and influential anthology, originally published in 1973 as Toward a Steady-State Economy, and twice revised (under different titles; see bibliography), in 1980 and 1993. Writers and topics in the original 1973 edition included:
 Nicholas Georgescu-Roegen on The Entropy Law and the Economic Process
 Preston Cloud on mineral resources
 Paul R. Ehrlich and John Holdren on population
 Leon R. Kass on bioethics
 Kenneth E. Boulding on the "Economics of the Coming Spaceship Earth"
 Garrett Hardin's 1968 article, "The Tragedy of the Commons"
 Daly on the steady-state economy
 Warren A. Johnson on the guaranteed income as an environmental measure 
 Richard England and Barry Bluestone on ecology and social conflict
 William Ophuls on political economy ("Leviathan or oblivion?")
 E.F. Schumacher on Small Is Beautiful (title of his book, also published in 1973)
 Walter A. Weisskopf on economic growth versus existential balance
 Daly's essay, "Electric power, employment, and economic growth: a case study in growthmania" 
 Jørgen Randers and Donella Meadows on the carrying capacity of the environment
 John B. Cobb on "ecology, ethics, and theology"
 C.S. Lewis on The Abolition of Man (an extract from his 1943 book of the same name)

Death
Daly died on October 28, 2022, at the age of 84.

Selected publications

Books
  
  Received the Grawemeyer Award for ideas for improving World Order.

Edited anthologies
 
  Revised edition of 1973 anthology.
  Revised edition of 1980 anthology.

Essays

Textbooks

Articles
 
 
 
See also: 
 
See also: Nicholas Georgescu-Roegen,  Robert Solow and Joseph Stiglitz.
  
  Paper presented to the UK Sustainable Development Commission 
 
Herman Daly interviewed by David Marchese, 'This Pioneering Economist Says Our Obsession With Growth Must End,'   New York Times 17 July 2022

See also 
 Ecological economics
 
 
 , Daly's comment on the Pope's 2015 encyclical

References

Further reading

External links

Center for the Advancement of the Steady State Economy (CASSE)
The Daly News, steady state commentary and related news, with essays by Herman Daly
First annual Feasta lecture, 1999, on "uneconomic growth in theory and in fact"
Steady-State Economics
Electric Politics interview (podcast)

1938 births
2022 deaths
American economists
Sustainability advocates
American systems scientists
University of Maryland, College Park faculty
Rice University alumni
Vanderbilt University alumni
Winners of the Heineken Prize
Ecological economists
Environmental economists
Georgist economists
People associated with criticism of economic growth
Anti-consumerists